Dominika Cibulková and Kirsten Flipkens were the defending champions, but Cibulková chose not to participate this year. Flipkens played alongside Kiki Bertens, but lost in the final to Elise Mertens and Demi Schuurs when Flipkens had to retire with the score at 3–3.

Seeds

Draw

Draw

References
Main Draw

Libéma Open - Doubles
2018 Women's Doubles